Resciebelle "Bella" Barrios Santiago (born 1 December 1989) is a Filipino singer. Santiago first received recognition in Romania in 2016, after becoming a finalist on season six of Românii au talent, Romania's version of Got Talent. She later received widespread attention after winning season eight of X Factor Romania in 2018.

Santiago has attempted to represent Romania in the Eurovision Song Contest on two occasions. She placed fourth in Selecția Națională 2018 with the song "Auzi cum bate", a collaboration with Romanian band Jukebox, and competed in Selecția Națională 2019 as a solo artist with the song "Army of Love", placing third.

Early life
Santiago was born in Dasmariñas, Philippines, and began singing at age 12. She was raised by her grandmother, after her father died when she was a year old and her mother left the Philippines to earn money for the family. At age 15, she began performing at local bars in Manila, and later participated in the Filipino televised singing competitions Pinoy Pop Superstar and Tawag ng Tanghalan. Prior to relocating to Romania, Santiago had worked in Malaysia and Taiwan.

Career

2016–present: Românii au talent, X Factor, and breakthrough
In 2016, Santiago auditioned for season six of Românii au talent. She ultimately reached the finals of the competition, but lost to Laura Bretan. After the competition, she was signed to Romanian record label Cat Music. Her debut single "Unpredictable" was released the following year, produced by Romanian singer and producer Smiley. In 2017, she began collaborating with Romanian band Jukebox. Together, they released three singles together: "Vocea ta", "Auzi cum bate", and "Sugar Gumalaw". "Auzi cum bate" was later selected to compete in Selecția Națională 2018, the Romanian national final for the Eurovision Song Contest 2018. Santiago and Jukebox advanced from the second semi-final held in Timișoara, and later competed in the final held in Bucharest on 25 February 2018. They ultimately placed fourth.

Later in 2018, Santiago auditioned for season eight of X Factor Romania. She advanced past her initial audition, and was mentored by Romanian singer Delia Matache during the course of the show. Santiago ultimately was crowned the winner of the competition on 23 December 2018. In January 2019, Romanian singer Dan Bittman announced his withdrawal from Selecția Națională 2019 due to scheduling conflicts, and the Romanian broadcaster Romanian Television (TVR) announced that two wildcard entries would replace him in the competition. A week later, Santiago was announced as one of the two wildcards with the song "Army of Love". Santiago competed in the first semi-final on 27 January 2019, advancing to the final after winning the jury vote. She competed in the final on 17 February 2019, and placed third behind Ester Peony.

Santiago competed in the 14th season of Te cunosc de undeva! (translation: I know you from somewhere!), the Romanian version of the talent show, Your Face Sounds Familiar. She won the season, gaining 87 points in the finale.

Personal life
Santiago moved to Bucharest in 2016, in order to be with her Romanian boyfriend Nicolae Ionuț Grigorie. They had previously met while both were living in Malaysia. Santiago and Grigorie married in December 2018. Santiago has one daughter from a previous relationship; neither her nor her daughter are in contact with the father.

Discography

References

External links

1989 births
21st-century Filipino singers
21st-century Romanian singers
21st-century Romanian women singers
Filipino women pop singers
Filipino emigrants to Romania
Filipino expatriates in Malaysia
Filipino expatriates in Taiwan
Living people
Românii au talent contestants
Romanian women pop singers
Musicians from Bucharest
People from Dasmariñas
Tawag ng Tanghalan contestants
The X Factor winners